Snapper were a New Zealand band that formed in Dunedin in 1988. They released two studio albums.

Discography

Albums

Extended plays

References

New Zealand indie rock groups
Flying Nun Records artists
Musical groups established in 1988
Dunedin Sound musical groups
1988 establishments in New Zealand
New Zealand experimental rock groups

External links
Snapper on Flying Nun